Richard Guay may refer to:

 Richard Guay (politician) (born 1943), a politician in Quebec
 Richard Guay (film producer), American film producer
 Richard Guay (ice hockey), Canadian ice hockey goaltender who was drafted by the Philadelphia Flyers in the 1974 NHL amateur draft